Vincent Luizzi is an American philosopher and Professor of Philosophy at Texas State University.
He is known for his expertise on legal ethics and philosophy of law. Luizzi was the Chair of Philosophy at Texas State University (1982-2014). He is also a member of the
State Bar of Texas and a municipal judge in San Marcos, TX.

Books
 New and Old World Philosophy, with Audrey McKinney, Prentice Hall, 2001
 A Case for Legal Ethics: Legal Ethics as a Source for a Universal Ethic, with a foreword by John R. Silber, State University of New York Press, 1993. 
 A Naturalistic Theory of Justice: Critical Commentary and Readings on C.I. Lewis's Ethics, University Press of America, 1981.

References

External links
Vincent Luizzi at Texas State University
 

21st-century American philosophers
Analytic philosophers
Philosophy academics
Philosophers of law
Political philosophers
University of Pennsylvania alumni
University of Rochester alumni
Texas State University faculty
Living people
Municipal judges in the United States
Year of birth missing (living people)